Rebecca Louise Vest (born April 3, 1948) is an American former professional tennis player.

Vest, a native of Jackson, Mississippi, is the daughter of tennis player Dorothy Vest and played collegiate tennis for Trinity University in Texas. She won back to back intercollegiate doubles championships with Emily Burrer 1968 and 1969. On the international tour, she had appearances at the French Open and Wimbledon.

References

External links
 

1948 births
Living people
American female tennis players
Trinity Tigers women's tennis players
Tennis people from Mississippi
Sportspeople from Jackson, Mississippi